The year 1759 in architecture involved some significant architectural events and new buildings.

Events
Work begins on Harewood House in Yorkshire, England, designed by John Carr and Robert Adam.

Buildings and structures

Buildings completed

Dumfries House in Scotland, designed by Robert Adam.
 West front of Trinity College Dublin (Ireland) on College Green, designed by Henry Keene and John Sanderson.
 Royal Palace of Riofrío in Spain, designed by Virgilio Rabaglio.

Births
January 21 – François Baillairgé, French Canadian architect, painter and sculptor (died 1830)
May 20 – William Thornton, physician, inventor, painter and architect, first Architect of the Capitol (died 1828)

Deaths
June 3 – Carlo Francesco Dotti, Bolognese architect (born 1670)

References